Robert Davenport (26 November 1852 – 22 December 1934) was a New Zealand cricketer. He played two first-class matches for Otago between 1881 and 1884.

Davenport was the son of Robert Davenport. He was born at Adelaide in South Australia and educated in England at Mill Hill School.

References

1852 births
1934 deaths
New Zealand cricketers
Otago cricketers
Cricketers from Adelaide